Roam is a Canadian electronic musician, record producer and songwriter based out of Toronto. Roam gained notoriety in late 2017 for his production style which often blends UK garage, future garage and 2-step garage influences with modern Toronto hip hop sounds and production techniques. Roam has released two full-length albums, an EP and several singles since 2017. In 2022 he was named one of 8 artists shaping the future of Canadian electronic music

Musical career

2017–2018 
Roam released the singles "Taker" and "Say It" in 2017, the latter of which prompted NOW magazine to claim Roam was both a "musician to watch" as well as the music producer bringing musical styles such as UK garage, trip hop and early 2000s minimal house to Toronto.

On 14 February 2018, Roam released his debut album, Remnants on Vice.  Noisey writer Phil Witmer claimed Roam was "the producer bringing dark UK garage to Toronto" comparing his music to the work of UK Bass and Future garage artist Burial. Witmer also stated that Remnants emphasized the cultural and musical ties that London and Toronto share. The album received warm praise from Kevin Press of Exclaim! Magazine who made note of Roam's production and sampling of R&B vocals.

Shortly after the release of Remnants Roam released the single "Echoes" in early spring. The single was included in a NOW Magazine playlist made up of music from Toronto's "Rising Stars".

In April, Toronto rap duo HardToKill released their self-titled project Hard To Kill featuring "Papercranes", which was produced by Roam.

In July, Roam released a 4 track EP, Depths, which was inspired by a three-year period during which he struggled with mental health complications. Depths also received praise from Exclaim! Magazine.

In October 2018, Roam premiered the acoustic UKG song "Embraced..." on Complex's UK site.

2019 
In March 2019, with the help of writer Melissa Vincent, Roam published a series of poems on Canadian music and pop culture website A.Side to help illustrate the meanings and circumstances behind each song on Depths.

On the same day as the release of the poems, Roam also premiered the song "All Night" on indie music blog Ohestee.

In late spring, Toronto-based arts and culture publication Demo Magazine published their 15th Issue highlighting Sean Leon and Roam, framing them as  "new artists who are just emerging onto the dynamic Canadian music scene." The issue included a 2-page interview feature on Roam in which he was dubbed "Toronto's Future Garage Producer".

Later that year, Roam released the song "Regrets".

2020 
In early May, Roam released the lead up singles "Momentum" and "Fools Errand", shortly afterwards releasing his second album, The Wraith, on 16 May 2020. The album was featured on Resident Advisor and XLR8R. The Wraith was about what it feels like to "drift apart from our oldest & dearest friends, the ones who we often assume will be around forever & with whom we’ve shared considerably large parts of our lives." The title ‘The Wraith’ is a metaphor for "the memory of the bond you had with someone and how it can haunt you before you accept reality & move on". North American RA Editor Andrew Ryce stated that "the album features gorgeous, perfectly swung tracks". Jordan Darville of The Fader called the album "a hidden gem with flashes of brilliant color dancing across its overwhelming greyscale".

Roam's production on The Wraith draws elements from various other musical genres in addition to the genres Roam usually employs. The album includes a re-worked version of Roam's 2018 single "Embraced..." that featured different drums, more guitar elements and a modified arrangement. The tone of the album was inspired by films such as Eternal Sunshine of the Spotless Mind, Her and Lost in Translation, featuring dialogue from each film. The final song "Fools Errand" (the third of the album's three bonus tracks) was inspired by the collective societal anxieties induced by the physical distancing and self-quarantine protocols used to contain the COVID-19 pandemic.

In July, while fundraising through Bandcamp for initiatives that support Black Lives and Anti-racism Roam released the song "Reckonings", a song inspired by the global BLM protests against racial injustices as well as his own experiences as a Black Person. The song was featured on NOW Magazine's Best Music of 2020 List.

In early August, Roam released the song "Whispers" with independent experimental label Biblioteka Records.

On 19 October, a music video for the song "Fools Errand" was released and was featured on Resident Advisor. The video, much like the song itself was also inspired by the COVID-19 physical distancing and self-quarantine measures.

On 21 December, Roam released "How To Let Go". The single was featured in The Fader, Resident Advisor and NOW Magazine. The Fader called the single an example of sonic hauntology with "inviting synths that dance like butterflies over the skittering beat, as stretched vocals moan like ghostly choirs." The Resident Advisor piece revealed that the song was intended to be "a bit of an early xmas gift that encouraged people to positively look towards the future after the horrendous year we've had". NOW included the song in their "Start 2021 on a High Note" music feature.

Discography

Studio albums

Extended plays

Singles

Music videos

References 

UK garage musicians
Future garage musicians
Downtempo musicians
Canadian songwriters
Canadian electronic musicians
Canadian experimental musicians
Living people
Canadian record producers
Black Canadian musicians
Canadian Internet celebrities
Year of birth missing (living people)
Musicians from Toronto